The 1999 U.S. 500 Presented by Toyota was the twelfth round of the 1999 CART FedEx Champ Car World Series season, held on July 25, 1999 at the Michigan International Speedway in Brooklyn, Michigan.

Report

Race 
The qualifying saw Jimmy Vasser take the pole with Adrián Fernández alongside, but at the second attempt to start (the first was called off due to field alignment issues), it was the second-row starters Juan Pablo Montoya and Michael Andretti who raced away into the first two spots. In the early stages, the duo exchanged the lead many times (most unofficial, though) before Andretti was able to build a lead. He led until the second round of pit stops when a caution due to Gil de Ferran's crash bunched the field up, allowing second-placed Montoya to close and pass him on the restart. The duo again battled for the lead, but then Max Papis surged bast both of them and began to pull away. Papis led comfortably until a crash for P. J. Jones erased a nine-second lead and allowed Andretti to jump him in the pit stops. The restart saw Papis battle with Andretti and Dario Franchitti for a few laps before breaking away again, only for another caution caused by Scott Pruett's crash to again bring the field closer to him. Once again Papis was able to pull away from his pursuers when the race went green, as an epic battle for second commenced between the Team Green duo of Franchitti and Paul Tracy, and the Newman-Haas duo of Andretti and Christian Fittipaldi, which was later joined by Montoya and Tony Kanaan as well. After the final round of pit stops, Papis continued to lead, though Kanaan, on an alternate strategy was able to run 5-7 laps longer than other frontrunners and thus had a shorter stop and was up to second, only three seconds behind Papis, and well ahead of a battle between Andretti, Franchitti, and Tracy for third. Kanaan initially closed up on Papis, but Papis was able to pull away again, and, behind them, the Ganassi drivers, Montoya and Jimmy Vasser started to set a searing pace. Both passed Andretti, Franchitti, and Tracy and set off after Kanaan, lapping much quicker than anyone else. However, Vasser had to pit for more fuel after a problem with the fuel rig, and this also made Montoya's task harder as he now had to chase Kanaan on his own without his teammate's help. Papis continued to lead and was well set to take his first career win only for his car to run out of fuel midway through the last lap. Kanaan went by but Montoya was right with him and attempted to pass him at the line. Kanaan however, held on to beat Montoya by 0.032 seconds, with Tracy taking the final step of the podium after passing Andretti at the line.

Classification

Race

Caution flags

Lap Leaders

Point standings after race

References 

U.S. 500
Michigan Indy 400